Liberty Township is a township in Mitchell County, Iowa, USA.

History
Liberty Township was established about 1869.

References

Townships in Mitchell County, Iowa
Townships in Iowa